Jani Honkanen (born September 20, 1979) is a Finnish ice hockey player. He currently plays with Arystan Temirtau  in the Kazakhstan Hockey Championship.

Honkanen won the 2012-13 SM-liiga championship while playing with Ässät.

References

External links

1979 births
Living people
Finnish ice hockey defencemen
Sportspeople from Espoo
Arystan Temirtau players
Ässät players
Espoo Blues players
Fort Wayne Komets players
HC Keski-Uusimaa players
Herning Blue Fox players
HIFK (ice hockey) players
HPK players
Kiekko-Vantaa players
Kokkolan Hermes players
KooKoo players
Lahti Pelicans players
SaiPa players
Tappara players